Events in the year 2006 in Portugal.

Incumbents
President: Aníbal Cavaco Silva
Prime Minister: José Sócrates

Events
22 January – Portuguese presidential election, 2006
Disestablishment of the National Solidarity Party.

Arts and entertainment
In music: Portugal in the Eurovision Song Contest 2006.

Film
9 March – Magic Mirror released.

Sports
Football (soccer) competitions: Primeira Liga, Liga de Honra, Taça de Portugal.

Deaths

18 January – Leonardo Ribeiro de Almeida, politician (b. 1924).

16 April – Francisco Adam, actor (born 1983).

27 July – Carlos Roque, comics book artist (b. 1936).

26 November – Mário Cesariny de Vasconcelos, surrealist poet and painter (b. 1923).

See also
List of Portuguese films of 2006

References

 
2000s in Portugal
Years of the 21st century in Portugal
Portugal